Tell Malah is a Syrian town located in the Mahardah Subdistrict of the Mahardah District in Hama Governorate. According to the Syria Central Bureau of Statistics (CBS), Tell Malah had a population of 876 in the 2004 census.

References 

Populated places in Mahardah District